The 2014 NCAA Division I softball tournament was held from May 15 through June 5, 2014 as the final part of the 2014 NCAA Division I softball season. The 64 NCAA Division I college softball teams were selected out of an eligible 293 teams on May 11, 2014. 32 teams were awarded an automatic bid as champions of their conference, and 32 teams were selected at-large by the NCAA Division I Softball Selection Committee. The tournament culminated with eight teams playing in the 2014 Women's College World Series at ASA Hall of Fame Stadium in Oklahoma City.

New to the tournament
This season the number of automatic bids increased from 31 to 32. The change occurred after the original Big East Conference split along football lines into a new non-football Big East Conference and the football-sponsoring American Athletic Conference. Also new this season was the WCC, which began sponsoring softball after the Pacific Tigers returned to the conference. The WCC replaced the Pacific Coast Softball Conference, which dissolved after all its members joined either the WCC or the WAC.

Automatic bids
The Big 12, Big West, Mountain West, Pac-12, and West Coast Conference bids went to the regular season champion. All other conferences had the automatic bid go to the conference tournament winner.

National seeds
Teams in italics advanced to super regionals. Teams in bold advanced to Women's College World Series.

Alabama

Florida
Louisiana–Lafayette

Regionals and super regionals
The Regionals took place May 15–18 with Seattle being May 15–17 and all other regionals May 16–18. The super regionals took place from May 22–25.

Eugene Super Regional

Tallahassee Super Regional

Gainesville Super Regional

Athens Super Regional

Los Angeles Super Regional

Lafayette Super Regional

Norman Super Regional

Tuscaloosa Super Regional

Women's College World Series
The Women's College World Series was held May 29 through June 4, 2014 in Oklahoma City.

Participants

 † = From NCAA Division I Softball Championship Results

Bracket

Championship game

Media coverage

Radio
Westwood One provided nationwide radio coverage of the championship series, which was streamed online at westwoodsports.com and through TuneIn. Kevin Kugler and Leah Amico provided the call for Westwood One.

Television
ESPN carried every game from the Women's College World Series across the ESPN Networks (ESPN, ESPN2 and ESPNU). The ESPN Networks also carried select regional matches and every super regional match utilizing ESPN, ESPN2, ESPNU and ESPN3. Outside of the ESPN Networks Regional matches, Pac-12 Network picked up all Oregon matches in the Eugene region and BTN picked up the Sunday championship games in the Minneapolis Region.

Broadcast assignments

Regionals
Ann Schatz & Tammy Blackburn - Eugene, OR (Oregon games)
Cara Capuano & Leah O'Brien-Amico - Tuscaloosa, AL
Tracy Warren & Amanda Freed - Los Angeles, CA
Melissa Lee & Kayla Braud - Lafayette, LA
Mark Neely & Jenny Dalton-Hill - Norman, OK
Pam Ward & Michele Mary Smith - Tallahassee, FL
Beth Mowins & Jessica Mendoza - Tempe, AZ
Adam Amin & Amanda Scarborough - Tucson, AZ
Lisa Byington & Jennie Ritter - Minneapolis, MN (Games 6 & 7)
Women's College World Series
Pam Ward or Beth Mowins; Jessica Mendoza or Michele Smith; Holly Rowe

Super regionals
Joe Davis & Leah O'Brien-Amico - Eugene, OR
Adam Amin & Amanda Scarborough - Tuscaloosa, AL
Holly Rowe & Amanda Freed - Los Angeles, CA
Cara Capuano & Cheri Kempf - Athens, GA
Mark Neely & Jenny Dalton-Hill - Gainesville, FL
Melissa Lee & Kayla Braud - Lafayette, LA
Beth Mowins & Jessica Mendoza - Norman, OK
Pam Ward & Michele Mary Smith - Tallahassee, FL
Women's College World Series championship series
Beth Mowins, Michele Smith, Jessica Mendoza, Holly Rowe

References

External links
Women's College World Series 2014 official home page
Women's College World Series 2014 official bracket

NCAA Division I softball tournament
Tournament